Invariance theorem may refer to:
Chou's invariance theorem, a result in multivariate statistics
Invariance of domain, a theorem in topology
A theorem pertaining to Kolmogorov complexity
A result in classical mechanics for adiabatic invariants
A theorem of algorithmic probability

See also
Invariant (mathematics)